Harvey Skolnik (June 15, 1935 – January 8, 1999) was an American actor, director, producer and screenwriter. He was nominated for an Academy Award in the category Best Original Screenplay for the film Private Benjamin. He also was nominated for two Primetime Emmy Awards in the category Outstanding Comedy Series for his work on The Odd Couple and Love, American Style. 

In January 1999, Miller died of heart failure at his home in Los Angeles, California, at the age of 63.

Filmography 
Studio One (1957) (TV)
The Mothers-In-Law (1967-1968) (TV)
Accidental Family (1967-1968) (TV)
That Girl (1968) (TV)
Gomer Pyle U.S.M.C. (1969)
The Ghost & Mrs. Muir (1968) (TV)
Love American Style (1969-1974)
Barefoot in the Park (1970) (TV)
The Odd Couple (1970-1975)
Anna and the King (1972) (TV)
The Bob Newhart Show (1972-1978) (TV)
Sirota's Court (1976-1977) (TV)
Laverne and Shirley (Supervising Producer) (1978) (TV)
Private Benjamin (1980) (with Nancy Meyers and Charles Shyer)
Student Bodies (1981) (Executive Producer)
Jekyll and Hyde...Together Again (with Monica Johnson Jerry Belson and Michael Leeson) (1982)
The Cannonball Run II (with Hal Needham and Albert S. Ruddy) (1984)
Protocol (story only, with Nancy Meyers, Charles Shyer and Buck Henry) (1984)
Bad Medicine (1985) (based on a novel by Steven Horowitz and Neil Offen) (also Director) (1985)
Getting Away with Murder (also Director) (1996)

References

External links 

1935 births
1999 deaths
People from New York (state)
Male actors from New York (state)
Television producers from New York (state)
American male film actors
American male television actors
American film directors
American television directors
American television producers
American male screenwriters
American television writers
American male television writers
American comedy writers
20th-century American screenwriters
20th-century American male writers